The Western Oceanic languages is a linkage of Oceanic languages, proposed and studied by .

Classification
The West Oceanic linkage is made up of three sub-linkages:
North New Guinea linkage
Meso-Melanesian linkage
Papuan Tip linkage

The center of dispersal was evidently near the Willaumez Peninsula on the north coast of New Britain.

Notes

References
 
 

 
Oceanic languages